Marvin the Tap-Dancing Horse (also known as Edouard et Martin for the French dub in Quebec) is a children's animated television series co-produced by Nelvana and Hong Guang Animation for Teletoon and PBS Kids. It tells the stories of a young horse named Marvin who is part of a carnival. Among the executive producers are Michael Paraskevas and Betty Paraskevas, creators of Maggie and the Ferocious Beast, who also created the book that the show is based on.

The show aired on PBS Kids in the United States as part of the PBS Kids Bookworm Bunch from 2000 to 2004. In Canada, it aired on Teletoon, and in the United Kingdom, the series also aired on Tiny Pop. Reruns of the show aired on Qubo in the US from 2007 to 2020.

Some episodes include original songs to help illustrate the theme or accompany montages that carry the story forward.

Characters
Marvin (voiced by Ron Pardo) is a dancing brown horse with a black mane and a tail who performs in Fast-Talking Jack's carnival. He used to be in movies and on Broadway, his first big break, although he's not proud of his performance in it. His hooves are tuxedo-themed and they make the tapping sounds. He also wears a red bowtie around his neck. In the beginning of one of the episodes, it is taken off.
Edward Larue III ("Eddy Largo") (voiced by Marlowe Gardiner-Heslin) is a 9-year-old boy. In the first episode, he looks for a job and is hired on as a gofer and all-around assistant to owner Fast-Talking Jack. He changes his name to "Eddy Largo" because he felt that his real name was apparently too bland. 
Diamonds (voiced by Fiona Reid) is a fancy pink elephant. She is the main attraction of the circus. She has a big cloth on her back with a yellow star as a decoration. Her act involves balancing on an inflated beach ball. She appears in almost every episode, most notably "Dare to Dream".
Elizabeth the Emotional Pig (voiced by Sheila McCarthy) is easily upset and has a tendency to moan and cry. When things go right, she feels ecstatically happy. She wears a turquoise dress with two yellow lines on her skirt with buttons, collar flaps and cuffs. Her specialty is juggling, usually pineapples. She also compulsively eats corn on the cob. She appears in almost every episode, most notably "Elizabeth in Charge".
Stripes the Tiger (voiced by Ron Pardo) is rather grumpy, but has a soft spot for "Mr. Grizzly", his torn-and-tattered stuffed bear. It's mentioned in the episode "Stripes Takes Off" that he weighs 400 pounds. His favorite meals are 32 chickens for dinner and a giant bowl of Crunchy Creatures cereal soaked for 10 minutes to have the right degree of sogginess for breakfast. He also enjoys reading the newspaper. Being a tiger, most people are afraid of him, so he is often seen inside his cage.
Fast-Talking Jack (voiced by Dwayne Hill) is the owner of the carnival and a ringmaster of the big show in which he also plays a "lion tamer" for Stripes' act.
Edna (voiced by Robin Duke) is the smart fortune teller who also makes the lemonade and lemon ice sold at the carnival. She is a stickler for using juice she hand squeezes herself. Her screechy singing voice can break glass. Although she's not in many episodes, her most notable appearances are in "Eddy's Fortune" and "Edna the Singing Sensation".
Lyman Slime (voiced by Rummy Bishop) is the sleazy owner of a clown circus, who sees Jack's carnival as unwelcomed competition. He sometimes sends his three clowns to spy on the carnival or to sabotage it.
The Penguin's Five are a band that accompanies the acts at the performance tent, made up of five penguins (hence the name).
Eddy's Grandma can be somewhat formidable, has a habit of firmly tapping the floor with her cane when wanting to emphasize a point. Eddy spends the summer at her house while he works at the carnival. She still calls Eddy his real name, Edward.
Squinty Pete is the proprietor of the Whomp-A-Weasel game in the carnival's midway.
Mr. P. Nutty sells peanuts during the big show and around the carnival. Wears a Peanut costume featuring a huge grin. His real name is Philbert, has a high-pitched voice and professes to be shy.
Lulabelle Rose is a tan mare with a light brown mane and tail with red lips and a daisy on her ear and Marvin's girlfriend. She is great at tap dancing just like him. Her only appearance is "The Importance of Being Eddy".
Lucy is Jack's niece who appeared in the episode "Eddy's Charm". Eddy has a crush on her.
Boris is a Russian circus bear looking for work at the circus. He specializes in peeling peanuts and telling stories about Russia. He appeared in "Truth or Bear".
Clyde is a racehorse who is Marvin's younger brother (even though he's now bigger than Marvin). He appeared in "Marvin Keeps Track". He and Marvin used to do great things together when they were young and Marvin was always the winner, but now Clyde always beats Marvin. Marvin was not pleased to see him because he had forgotten that about their past, but then Clyde reminded him. So if not for Marvin, Clyde never would've been a racehorse.

Episodes

Season 1 (2000)

Season 2 (2001–2002)

References

External reference
Marvin the Tap Dancing Horse Summary of the Show
Marvin the Tap Dancing Horse Synopsis
Nelvana: Marvin the Tap Dancing Horse Episode Guide

2000s Canadian animated television series
2000s Canadian children's television series
2000 Canadian television series debuts
2001 Canadian television series endings
2000 Chinese television series debuts
2001 Chinese television series endings
2000s preschool education television series
Canadian children's animated comedy television series
Canadian children's animated education television series
Canadian children's animated fantasy television series
Canadian television shows based on children's books
Chinese children's animated comedy television series
Chinese children's animated fantasy television series
Circus television shows
English-language television shows
PBS Kids shows
PBS original programming
Television series by Nelvana
Teletoon original programming
Treehouse TV original programming
Animated television series about children
Animated television series about horses
Animated television series about elephants
Television series about tigers
Animated television series about pigs
Animated television series about penguins